Lesedi FM is a South African PBS radio network owned by the South African Broadcasting Corporation (SABC).

Coverage areas and frequencies 
The station was launched in 1960 and is currently available in seven provinces with a spill-over to the other two on 87.7 – 106.6 FM frequencies.

Lesedi FM broadcasts from Bloemfontein to the Sesotho-speaking and understanding communities. It is the biggest Sesotho radio station in South Africa.

It is the 4th largest radio station in South Africa with an audience of 3.46 million with the highest audience share of 62% in the Free State and 10% in Gauteng.

Target audience
Lesedi FM is an urban/metro radio station with the highest SEM 5-8, with a primary target audience of 25-49 with 52%, secondary  15-24 with 20% and loyal 50+ at 28%. Female 54% vs. Male 46%

Listenership figures

References

External links 
Lesedi FM Website
SAARF Website
Sentech Website

Radio stations in Bloemfontein
Sotho language